Arthur Wood (birth unknown) is an English former professional rugby league footballer who played in the 1940s and 1950s.

Playing career

International honours
Arthur Wood won a cap for England while at Featherstone Rovers in 1951 against Other Nationalities, and represented Rugby League XIII while at Leeds in 1954 against Australasia.

County honours
Arthur Wood won caps for Yorkshire while at Featherstone Rovers; during the 1950–51 season against Lancashire and Cumberland.

Club career
Arthur Wood made his début for Featherstone Rovers on Saturday 14 February 1948.

References

External links
(archived by web.archive.org) Floodlit feast at Odsal

Living people
England national rugby league team players
English rugby league players
Featherstone Rovers players
Leeds Rhinos players
Place of birth missing (living people)
Rugby league hookers
Rugby League XIII players
Year of birth missing (living people)
Yorkshire rugby league team players